Timmy Williams (born April 10, 1981)  is an American comedian and radio personality. He is a member of the sketch comedy troupe The Whitest Kids U' Know, and starred in its eponymous television show, which ran for five seasons.

Career
Williams and Darren Trumeter are the only members of Whitest Kids not to attend New York's School of Visual Arts. He met and joined the group as a result of the September 11 attacks. Williams and fellow Whitest Kid Sam Brown appeared as The Guardians of the Doors in an episode of the 2008 Adult Swim series Fat Guy Stuck in Internet.

Williams announces for the radio station KXLG. He has performed at Keep Portland Funny.

References

External links
 What the Hell Is Timmy Doing in South Dakota? podcast
 
 
 

1981 births
Male actors from South Dakota
American male comedians
21st-century American comedians
American male television actors
American television writers
American male television writers
Living people
People from Watertown, South Dakota
Screenwriters from South Dakota
21st-century American screenwriters
21st-century American male writers
21st-century American male actors